Elachista varensis is a moth of the family Elachistidae that is found in France.

References

varensis
Moths described in 1992
Endemic insects of Metropolitan France
Moths of Europe